Browning is both a surname and a given name. Notable people with the name include:

Surname 
Alan Browning, professional name of Alan Brown (1926–1979), English actor
Baron Browning (born 1999), American football player
Cal Browning (1938–2022), American baseball player
Christopher Browning, American historian focusing on the Holocaust
Curtis Browning (born 1993), Australian Rugby Union player
D'Arcy Browning, Canadian actor
David Browning, American Olympic diver
Donovan Browning, English footballer
Elizabeth Barrett Browning, English poet
Emma Carter Browning (1910–2010), American pilot and aviation executive
Emily Browning, Australian actor
Ethel Browning (actress) (1876/1877 – 1965), American actress and screenwriter
Ethel Browning (toxicologist) (1891–1969), British medical researcher
Frederick Browning, English World War II lieutenant general
George Browning (bishop) (born 1942), Anglican Bishop of Canberra and Goulburn
George L. Browning (1867–1947), American justice
Greg Browning, Australian field hockey player
Guy Browning, British humorist and author
Jake Browning (born 1996), American football player
John Browning (disambiguation), several people
Jonathan Browning (disambiguation), several people
Keith Browning, British meteorologist
Kurt Browning, Canadian skater
Kurt S. Browning, Florida politician
Martin Browning (born 1946), British professor of economics
Maurice Browning (1919–1983), English actor
Miles Browning (1897–1954), American World War II rear admiral
Richard Browning (disambiguation), several people
Ricou Browning (1930–2023), American actor and film director
Robert Browning, English poet
Tod Browning, American film director
Tom Browning (1960–2022), American baseball player
Tom Browning (entomologist) (1920–1998), Australian scientist
Tracey Browning (born 1963), Australian basketball player
Tyias Browning (born 1994), English footballer
Val A. Browning (1895–1994), American firearms inventor and industrialist

Given name 
Browning Bryant, professional name of John Baxter Browning Bryant (1957–2019), American singer-songwriter
Browning Mummery (1888–1974), Australian operatic tenor
Browning Ross, American athlete at the 1948 and 1952 Olympics, known as the father of long-distance running in the United States